Maley is a surname. Notable people with the surname include:

 Alan Maley (1931–1995), British special effects artist
 Anna A. Maley (1872–1918), American journalist and political activist
 Charles Maley (1876–1929), Australian politician
 David Maley (born 1963), American ice hockey player
 Henry Maley (1878–1956), Australian politician
 James Maley (1908–2007), Scottish political activist
 Mark Maley (born 1981), English footballer
 Peggy Maley (born 1924), American actress
 Tom Maley (1864–1935), Scottish footballer
 Florence Turner-Maley (1871-1962) American composer, singer and teacher
 Wesley Maley (1857–1926), Australian politician
 Willie Maley (1868–1958), Scottish footballer
 Willy Maley (born 1960), Scottish writer

See also
 Maley & Taunton
 O'Malley (disambiguation)
 Malley, a surname
 Mally (disambiguation)
 Maly (disambiguation)